California Park is an unincorporated community in Marin County, California, United States, and a suburb of San Rafael. It lies north of San Quentin State Prison.  Marin Sanitary Service is the largest tenant in the area.

The community is in ZIP code 94901 and area codes 415 and 628.

The Cal Park Hill Tunnel 

The Cal Park Hill Tunnel runs for  through the hill to Larkspur.  It opened in 1884 and was a double-track train tunnel owned by Northwestern Pacific Railroad. Train service stopped in the 1960s.  It is now owned by Sonoma–Marin Area Rail Transit (SMART). After a $27-million project, jointly funded by SMART and Marin County, half of the tunnel reopened on December 10, 2010, as a bicycle and pedestrian path. Sonoma–Marin Area Rail Transit uses the other half to connect the line from downtown San Rafael to the Larkspur Ferry Terminal. Originally estimated to cost $4 million, the tunnel was rehabilitated for pedestrian access at a cost of $28 million in 2010; additionally the rail line was extended from its temporary terminal at San Rafael Transit Center at a cost of $55.4 million.

References

Further reading

External links 
Marin Bike Coalition letter to SMART board
SMART homepage

Unincorporated communities in California
Unincorporated communities in Marin County, California